Tonkinosoma is a genus of millipede in the family Paradoxosomatidae. The genus contains three species, with a new species discovered in 2018. Type species was described from northern Vietnam. Now the species are ranges from Himalayan region and southeast Asian region.

They are characterized by the differences of gonopods. They have distinct or indistinct geniculation cingulum which show a postfemoral part demarcated basally. Femorite is long and slender.

See also
Tonkinosoma flexipes Jeekel, 1953 – northern Vietnam, China
Tonkinosoma tiani Liu & Golovatch, 2018 – southern China
Tonkinosoma jeekeli Nguyen, 2011 – northern Vietnam

References

Polydesmida